Frances Mary Hodgkins (28 April 1869 – 13 May 1947) was a New Zealand painter chiefly of landscape and still life, and for a short period was a designer of textiles. She was born and raised in New Zealand, but spent most of her working life in England. She is considered one of New Zealand's most prestigious and influential painters, although it is the work from her life in Europe, rather than her home country, on which her reputation rests.

Early life and education
Hodgkins was born in Dunedin, New Zealand in 1869, the daughter of Rachel Owen Parker and W. M. Hodgkins, a lawyer, amateur painter, and a leading figure in the city's art circles.

As a girl she and her sister, Isabel (later Field) attended Braemar House, a private girls' secondary school; both sisters demonstrated artistic talent early on and each became a successful landscape painter in her own right. Hodgkins first exhibited rural genre scenes and portraits in 1890 at art societies in Christchurch and Dunedin. In 1893, she became a student of Girolamo Nerli and painted numerous studies of female sitters, one of which earned her the New Zealand Academy of Arts' prize for painting from life in 1895 (Head of an Old Woman). Hodgkin's portraits of Māori are, like many by Ellen von Meyern and Gottfried Lindauer, associated with symbolic portraits of demure females with or without a child.  In 1895–96 she attended the Dunedin School of Art and subsequently became an art teacher, earning money to study in England.

Career 
In 1901, Hodgkins left New Zealand for Europe, enrolling in art school in London but also travelling and painting in France, the Netherlands, Italy and Morocco in the company of friend and fellow artist Dorothy Kate Richmond; whom she described as "the dearest woman with the most beautiful face and expression. I am a lucky beggar to have her as a travelling companion." While in Britain she intermittently met up with Margaret Stoddart, another expatriate artist. In 1903, one of Hodgkins' watercolors from this period (Fatima) became the first work by a New Zealander to be hung "on the line" at the Royal Academy of Arts in London.

She returned to New Zealand in 1903 and established a teaching studio in Wellington, where she held a joint exhibition with Richmond in 1904. Among her pupils was Edith Kate Bendall, lover of Katherine Mansfield. In the same year Hodgkins became engaged to a British man, T. Boughton Wilby, but the engagement was broken off and she returned to London in 1906 to pursue her artistic career.

In Europe, Hodgkins held her first solo show at the Paterson's Gallery in London in 1907 and moved to Paris in 1908. In 1910 she began teaching in Paris at Colarossi's academy as the first woman to be appointed instructor in the school. She also founded the School for Water Color. During this time she exhibited numerous watercolors at the Paris salon and came in contact with Canadian artist, Emily Carr, whom she taught while working on seascapes at Concarneau in Brittany.

During World War I she spent some time in Zennor, Cornwall, where she worked with the Swansea painter, Cedric Morris, who painted her portrait in 1917. She herself began to paint in oils in 1915.

In 1919, after the War, she went to France, where she was influenced by Matisse and Derain, but developed her own highly personal style, which made a strong impact at her one-person show in London at the Claridge Gallery in 1928. While in France she visited Nice in 1924 and there met Margaret Butler, a notable New Zealand sculptor.

In 1925, Hodgkins started work as a fabric designer at the Calico Printers' Association (CPA) in Manchester and during her employment visited the Exposition Internationale des Arts Decoratifs in Paris.

From the late 1920s on her style came to embrace modernist hallmarks such as abstracted, simplified forms and a strong emphasis on colour values and relationships. Although she continued to paint people, her work from this period also evidences an interest in fusing conventions of landscape with still life painting. In 1929 she joined the Seven and Five Society and worked alongside younger artists including Barbara Hepworth, Ben Nicholson and Henry Moore. In 1930, she "goaded" her friend Lucy Wertheim into opening her gallery in London to exhibit "artists who had not yet arrived".

During the 1930s Hodgkins exhibited with many important London galleries and gained a contract from the Lefevre Gallery to produce work for a full-scale exhibition every second year. In 1931 she became a painting companion of fellow New Zealand artist Maude Burge and painted still lifes at Burge's Villa in the garden terrace. Saint-Tropez. Her experimentation with mixing artistic genres continued, resulting in paintings that conflate still life with self-portraiture to sidestep physical appearance in self-representation. In 1939 she was invited to represent Britain at the 1940 Venice Biennale, but wartime travel restrictions meant that her work could not be transported to Venice. She was highly considered among British avant-garde society and by the later stages of her career was known as a key figure in British Modernism.

Because of World War II she spent the rest of her life in Britain. She continued to paint into her seventies, despite suffering from rheumatism and bronchitis. She died in Dorchester, Dorset on 13 May 1947. When she died she was regarded as one of Britain's leading artists.  In 1948 Myfanwy Evans (later Piper) wrote a concise book entitled Frances Hodgkins, as part of the 'Penguin Modern Painters' series, and the two were the only woman author and woman artist in the series of eighteen books.

Fellowship
The Frances Hodgkins Fellowship, established in 1962 at the University of Otago in Dunedin, New Zealand, is named after her.

Works in collections

Gallery

Notes

References

Further reading
 Iain Buchanan, Michael Dunn, and Elizabeth Eastmond Frances Hodgkins: Paintings and Drawings (2002, Auckland University Press) 
 Joanne Drayton, Frances Hodgkins: A Private Viewing (2005, Godwit, Auckland) 
 Elizabeth Eastmond and Merimeri Penfold, Women and the Arts in New Zealand. Forty Works: 1936–86 (1986, Penguin Books) 
 Catherine Hammond & Mary Kisler, eds Frances Hodgkins : European Journeys (2019, Auckland University Press & Auckland Art Gallery Toi o Tamaki) 
 Mary Kisler, Finding Frances Hodgkins, (2019, Massey University Press) 
 Anne Kirker, New Zealand Women Artists: A Survey of 150 Years (1986, Craftsman House) 
 E. H. McCormick, The Expatriate (1954, New Zealand University Press, Wellington)
 Samantha Niederman, Frances Hodgkins (2019, Eiderdown Books) 
 Emily-Jane Hills Orford, The Creative Spirit: Stories of 20th Century Artists (2008, Ottawa: Baico Publishing)

External links

 
 Biography in 1966 An Encyclopaedia of New Zealand
 Notes by Una Platts
 New Zealand exhibition catalogue
 Frances Hodgkins (Eiderdown Books)
 Auckland Art Gallery Toi o Tāmaki: Works by Frances Hodgkins 
 The Complete Francis Hodgkins by the Auckland Art Gallery Toi O Tāmaki
 Museum of New Zealand Te Papa Tongarewa: Frances Hodgkins
 Frances Hodgkins' close friendships with women
 Centenary exhibition catalogue, 1969

1869 births
1947 deaths
St Ives artists
Artists from Dunedin
19th-century New Zealand painters
20th-century New Zealand painters
19th-century New Zealand women artists
20th-century New Zealand women artists
People educated at Columba College
New Zealand women painters